Anaïs Demoustier (born Anaïs Aude Marie Michèle Demoustier; 29 September 1987) is a French actress. She has appeared in more than fifty films since 2000.

Personal life
During the filming of Marguerite & Julien, Demoustier began dating her co-star, Jérémie Elkaïm. In December 2015, it was announced that the couple were expecting their first child. Demoustier gave birth to a daughter in March 2016.

Filmography

Awards and nominations

References

External links 

 

1987 births
Living people
Mass media people from Lille
French film actresses
French television actresses
French stage actresses
21st-century French actresses
Best Actress César Award winners